Lisa Song Sutton (born March 11, 1985) is an American entrepreneur, attorney, real estate investor, motivational speaker, model, beauty pageant titleholder and former congressional candidate.

Early and personal life
Sutton was born in Seoul to an American father (Vietnam War Air Force veteran) and a South Korean mother. She moved to Arizona, aged five. She was involved in multiple extracurricular activities, including tap dancing, piano and flute lessons, ballet and gymnastics. She attended Buena High School in Sierra Vista, Arizona. She has a political science degree from the University of Arizona, and a Juris Doctor degree from the University of Miami School of Law.

Sutton was in a relationship with MMA fighter Cory Hendricks in 2018. She is Catholic.

Career
In 2005, she was a congressional intern for John McCain, handling calls or office visits. Shortly after graduation, Sutton moved to Las Vegas and worked as an attorney and vice president of human resources at Atkinson & Associates P.C., and then as vice president of business development for SSK Holdings, Inc.

In 2012, Sutton together with a modelling friend from Miami, started her first business called Sin City Cupcakes, specializing in alcohol-infused cupcakes and desserts. She went on to launch Ship Las Vegas, a shipping company and Liquid & Lace, a swimwear line. She is a licensed real estate agent, working at Elite Homes - Christie's International Real Estate, which she also co-founded. Her real estate business expanded in February 2022, following the purchase of Engel and Volkers, and is now  called Elite Homes - Engel & Volkers. Sutton is a general partner of The Veteran Fund.

Modelling and pageantry
Aged 19, Sutton began modelling part-time while in law school. She has been featured in multiple publications, including Sports Illustrated, GQ, Maxim, and Macy's swimwear advertisements.

In 2013, she was crowned Miss Las Vegas, and Miss Nevada United States in 2014.

Politics
Sutton was a Republican congressional candidate for Nevada’s 4th District in 2020, finishing third in the primaries behind Sam Peters and Jim Marchant.

References

1985 births
People from Seoul
Living people
Nevada Republicans
University of Miami School of Law alumni
University of Arizona alumni
American beauty pageant winners
American female models
American models of Korean descent
American people of Korean descent
Businesspeople from Nevada
American businesspeople
Businesspeople from Las Vegas
American motivational speakers
Women motivational speakers
21st-century American women
American women of Korean descent in politics